Motherwell Football Club are a Scottish professional association football club based in Motherwell, North Lanarkshire. The club compete in the Scottish Premiership, Scotland's Top Flight, and have done so since 1984. The club was formed in 1886 as part of a merger between Alpha and Glencairn.

Key
The records include the results of matches played in the Scottish Football League, Scottish Premier League, Scottish Premiership, Scottish Cup and Scottish League Cup.
The records exclude European matches. All records are from domestic competitions only.
The records do not include matches played in regional tournaments, such as the Lanarkshire Cup.
Wartime matches are regarded as unofficial and are excluded.
The season given as the "first" denotes the season in which Motherwell first played a match against that team.
The season given as the "last" designates the most recent season to have included a match between Motherwell and that side.
P = matches played; W = matches won; D = matches drawn; L = matches lost; Win% = percentage of total matches won
 † Denotes clubs in the same division as Motherwell in the 2017–18 season.
 ‡ Denotes clubs which are now defunct.

All–time statistics

a  All matches are either League or Cup matches played either home or away, excluding those played at neutral venues.
b  Results in all competitions until July 2012 are sourced to Fir Park Corner. Results in all competitions post July 2012 are sourced to BBC Sport.
c  Type in a team to get all head-to-head results against that team.

Matches played at neutral venues

a  All matches are either Semi-final or Final of cup competitions

European matches
For Motherwell matches in Europe, see Motherwell F.C. in European football

Notes

References

External links
Motherwell F.C. Head-to-head records
Soccerbase - The Football Database
Scottish Football Historical Archive

Record by club
Motherwell